Last Call at the Blue Note is a 1990 live album by Oscar Peterson; it is the third CD of the Telarc 4-CD set. The performance includes three of Oscar Peterson's famous originals: "Blues Etude", "March Past" and "Wheatland".

Track listing
 "Jim" (Caesar Petrillo, Milton Samuels, Nelson Shawn) – 7:02
 "Yours Is My Heart Alone" (Franz Lehár, Beda Fritz Loehner) – 11:38
 Medley:"It Never Entered My Mind"/"Body and Soul" (Lorenz Hart, Richard Rodgers)/(Frank Eyton, Johnny Green, Edward Heyman, Robert Sour) – 9:12
 "Wheatland" (Oscar Peterson) – 8:48
 Medley: "Our Waltz"/"Adagio"/"Bach's Blues" (David Rose)/(Peterson)/(Peterson) – 9:54
 "March Past" (Peterson) – 7:22
 "Blues Etude" (Peterson) – 7:22

Personnel

Performance
 Oscar Peterson – piano
 Bobby Durham – drums
 Ray Brown – double bass
 Herb Ellis - guitar

Production
 Donald Elfman - liner notes
 Kenneth Harmann - engineer
 Jack Renner
 Robert Woods - producer

References

Oscar Peterson live albums
1990 live albums
Telarc Records live albums
Albums recorded at the Blue Note Jazz Club